Fullerton railway station could refer to:

United Kingdom
 Meigle railway station, formerly known as Fullerton station 1861–1876, in Scotland
United States
 Fullerton Transportation Center, in Fullerton, California